The Sydney School, also the Nuts and Berries style, refers to an architectural style by a group of architects in Australia who reacted against international Modernism with their own regionalist style during the 1960s. In contrast to the purism of the international style, they were drawn to rustic materials, clinker bricks, low gutter lines, and raked roof lines rather than flat roof lines.

This loose collection of architects, comprising, among others, Peter Muller, Bill Lucas, Bruce Rickard, John James, Neville Gruzman and Ken Woolley, favoured organic and natural houses, often built on steep slopes and hidden from view in natural bushland. These projects were largely on the city's North Shore such as Woolley's own house, and to a lesser extent in the Eastern Suburbs. The alpine villages of Thredbo and Perisher are also notable for the many ski lodges designed in this style.

Following on from Walter Burley Griffin's work in the Sydney suburb of Castlecrag, this style of Australian architecture was visually sensitive to the environment and, like Griffin, often utilised natural local materials as structural elements.

See also
 List of heritage houses in Sydney

Notes

References
 
 

Architecture in Australia